George Duncan Rowe (1857–1934) was a British stockbroker, and the co-founder of Rowe & Pitman, with Frederick I. Pitman.

Life
He was the born in Valparaíso, Chile, the son of Charles Rowe, a Liverpool shipowner. He was educated at Marlborough College, followed by University College, Oxford, where he was a keen rower.

Rowe married Frances, a violinist, and they had seven children, including the rower Antony Rowe.

References

1857 births
1934 deaths
People from Valparaíso
Alumni of the University of Oxford
English stockbrokers
English company founders
English male rowers
Oxford University Boat Club rowers
People educated at Marlborough College